The Cabinet Secretary for Covid Recovery is a position in the Scottish Cabinet responsible for Scotland's recovery from the COVID-19 pandemic. The position was created by First Minister Nicola Sturgeon under her third administration.

The current Cabinet Secretary for Covid Recovery is Deputy First Minister John Swinney, who was appointed in May 2021.

Overview

Responsibilities 

 Government strategy
 Inter-governmental relations
 Cross government coordination of Covid Recovery policies
 Cross government co-ordination on Covid-19 recovery & Covid-19 strategic reviews
 Delivery and outcomes across portfolios
 Public service reform
 Cross government co-ordination on UN treaty incorporation
 Resilience 
 Government statistics
 Office of the Chief Researchers
 Local Government Boundary Commission
 National Performance Framework
 Historical abuse inquiry 
 Local governance review and democratic renewal 
 Efficient Government
 Cross-Government delivery of 'The Promise' to Care Experienced Young People

List of Office holders

References

Scottish Parliament
Cabinet Secretary posts of the Scottish Government
COVID-19 pandemic in Scotland
2021 establishments in Scotland
COVID-19 pandemic in the United Kingdom and government structures